Quarrel is a video game developed by Denki and published by UTV Ignition Entertainment. It is a word-based strategy game, described as "Scrabble x Risk x Countdown."  It was released for iOS devices on August 25, 2011 and on January 25, 2012 for Xbox Live Arcade.

Gameplay
In Quarrel, the aim of the game is to take all the territory from the other players (up to four). To do this, the player 'invades' neighboring territory and then must make a higher-scoring word than his or her opponent. Opponents include Dwayne, Caprice, Biff, Troy, Damien, Malik, Rex, Helena, and Kali. Dwayne is the easiest and Kali is the hardest.

Scoring
As with other word games, letters have individual scores. These range from 1 to 15, and value is based on commonality in spoken-word communications rather than written-word communications.

Letter scores are as follows:

Awards
 BAFTA Scotland 2011, Best Game

References

External links
 Denki homepage
 Guardian Gamesblog
 Square-Go.com

2011 video games
Digital tabletop games
IOS games
Video games developed in the United Kingdom
Word puzzle video games
Xbox 360 Live Arcade games
UTV Ignition Games games